CX-5 or CX5 may refer to:
Mazda CX-5, a compact crossover SUV produced by Mazda
Thatcher CX5, an American homebuilt aircraft
CX5, identifier for Cannabinoid receptor type 2, a G protein-coupled receptor from the cannabinoid receptor family
(6724) 1991 CX5, a main-belt minor planet
CX5 Division, a division of the Canadian Xtreme Paintball League

See also
Yamaha CX5M, an MSX-compatible computer made by Yamaha